There have been four baronetcies created for persons with the surname Baird, two in the Baronetage of Nova Scotia and two in the Baronetage of the United Kingdom.

Overview 

The first Baird Baronetcy of Newbyth in the County of Haddington, was created in the Baronetage of Nova Scotia on 4 February 1680 for William Baird, 1654-1737, son of Lord Sir John Baird, 1620-1698. Lord William Baird sat as Member of Parliament for Midlothian and was registered an Advocate and later made Lord of Session. The title became extinct in 1745 on the death of his son Sir John Baird, 2nd Bt. While the baronetcy failed, the Newbyth estate passed to his cousin William Baird of the Saughtonhall branch of the family.

The Baird Baronetcy of Saughtonhall (or Saughton Hall or Sauchtonhall) in the County of Edinburgh, was created in the Baronetage of Nova Scotia on 28 February 1695 for Robert Baird, Edinburgh merchant and son of James Baird, 5th of Auchmedden. He was a partner in the Leith Sugar House and an investor in a Scottish colony in the Carolinas. The title was created with remainder to the heirs male of his body. David Baird, the fourth Baronet died from wounds received at the Battle of Fontenoy in 1745. David's brother William Baird was the fifth Baronet. He was a captain in the Royal Navy. He married Frances, daughter of Colonel James Gardiner. Sir James Andrew Gardiner Baird, 11th Bt. of Saughtonhall is the current Petitioner to the Lord Lyon of Scotland, requesting to matriculate the Arms of Baird of Auchmedden and the Name and Arms of Baird. His son Alexander is heir apparent.

The Baird Baronetcy of Newbyth second creation, in the County of Haddington, was created in the Baronetage of the United Kingdom on 13 April 1809 for the soldier David Baird, grandson of William Baird, a younger son of Sir Robert Baird, 1st Baronet, of Saughtonhall. His father, William Baird, had inherited the Newbyth estate in 1745 on the death of Sir John Baird, 2nd Baronet, of the 1680 creation. The baronetcy was created with remainder to Baird's elder brother Robert Baird and the heirs male of his body. Sir David Baird died childless and was succeeded, according to the special remainder by his nephew David Baird, the second Baronet.

Both the Saughtonhall and the second Newbyth creations remain in the name of Baird and are extant as of 2022. Both baronetcies are descended from Andrew Baird who acquired lands of Auchmedden, Aberdeenshire, in 1534. The original Newbyth baronetcy was the senior cadet branch of Baird. At its extinction in 1745, Saughtonhall rose from junior to senior cadet branch of Baird. At the extinction of the Auchmedden line in 1806, Saughtonhall became the main line of Baird in Scotland, the line entitled to inherit the undifferenced Arms of Auchmedden.

The Baird Baronetcy of Urie was created in the Baronetage of the United Kingdom on 8 March 1897 for Alexander Baird of Urie of the junior cadet branch of the Bairds of Gartsherrie. This Baird Baronetcy ended with James Ian Baird, 3rd Bt. when he changed his name from Baird to Keith in 1967.

Baird baronets, of Newbyth; First creation (1680)

Sir William Baird, 1st Baronet (1654–1737)
Sir John Baird, 2nd Baronet (1686–1745)

Baird baronets, of Saughtonhall (1695)

Sir Robert Baird, 1st Baronet (died 1697)
Sir James Baird, 2nd Baronet (died 1715)
Sir Robert Baird, 3rd Baronet (c. 1690–1740)
Sir David Baird, 4th Baronet (c. 1729–1745)
Sir William Baird, 5th Baronet (d. 1771)
Sir James Gardiner Baird, 6th Baronet (d. 1830)
Sir James Gardiner Baird, 7th Baronet (1813–1896)
Sir William James Gardiner Baird, 8th Baronet (1854–1921)
Sir James Hozier Gardiner Baird, MC, 9th Baronet (1883–1966)
Sir James Richard Gardiner Baird, MC, 10th Baronet (1913–1997)
Sir (James) Andrew Gardiner Baird, 11th Baronet (born 1946)
In August 2019 Sir James petitioned the Lyon Court to matriculate the Arms of Auchmedden and request the honour of Chief of the Surname Baird. Delayed due to Covid-19 government lockdown in 2020, the process resumed when the lockdown was lifted in March 2022. The heir apparent to the baronetcy is Alexander Baird of Saughtonhall, the Younger (born 1986)

Baird baronets, of Newbyth; second creation (1809)
Sir David Baird, 1st Baronet, GCB, 1st Baronet (1757–1829)
Sir David Baird, 2nd Baronet (1795–1852)
Sir David Baird, 3rd Baronet, DL (1832 – 12 October 1913)
Sir David Baird, 4th Baronet, MVO, 4th Baronet (1865–1941)
Sir David Charles Baird, 5th Baronet (1912–2000)
Sir Charles William Stuart Baird, 6th Baronet (1939 - 14 August 2022)
The heir presumptive is Andrew James Baird (born 1970), a great-great-great grandson of the elder brother of the first baronet. As of January 2023, his matriculation to the Baronetcy is under standard review by the College of Arms.

Notes

References 
Kelly's Handbook to the Titled, Landed & Official Classes for 1903, 29th edition, London, 1903, p. 108.
Morris, Susan (author). Debrett's Peerage and Baronetage (2019 edition, p. 4974-4978). New York: St Martin's Press, 2020

External links
http://www.clanbaird.scot
https://www.baronetage.org/official-roll/

1809 establishments in the United Kingdom
Baronetcies in the Baronetage of Nova Scotia
Baronetcies in the Baronetage of the United Kingdom
Baronetcies created with special remainders